Anastasios 'Tasos' Dentsas (Greek: Αναστάσιος 'Τάσος' Δέντσας; born 19 March 1982) is a Greek footballer who plays for Apollon Paralimnio as a midfielder. He has been capped with the Greek U-21 squad.

Club career
Born in Vamvakofyto, Dentsas began playing football for local side Panserraikos in the Beta Ethniki. He played for OFI and Iraklis in the Greek Super League. In the summer of 2007, Dentsas joined Panetolikos, which was playing in the Gamma Ethniki at the time, and was an integral part and a captain of the squads that led Panetolikos to the Greek Superleague in the summer of 2011. On 2 January 2012, he was released from Panetolikos. On the same day, his transfer to Platanias F.C. was announced.

References

External links

Profile at Onsports.gr

1982 births
Living people
Greek footballers
Panserraikos F.C. players
OFI Crete F.C. players
Iraklis Thessaloniki F.C. players
Panetolikos F.C. players
Platanias F.C. players
Kavala F.C. players
Apollon Paralimnio F.C. players
Association football midfielders
People from Sidirokastro
Footballers from Central Macedonia